The Dominican National Time Trial Championship decides the national time trial champion of the Dominican Republic.

Men

Elite

U23

Women

Elite

References

See also
Dominican Republic National Road Race Championships

National road cycling championships
Cycle racing in the Dominican Republic